Folke Johnson (June 15, 1887 – February 20, 1962) was a Swedish sailor who competed in the 1912 Summer Olympics. He was a crew member of the Swedish boat Erna Signe, which won the silver medal in the 12 metre class.

References

External links
profile

1887 births
1962 deaths
Swedish male sailors (sport)
Sailors at the 1912 Summer Olympics – 12 Metre
Olympic sailors of Sweden
Olympic silver medalists for Sweden
Olympic medalists in sailing
Medalists at the 1912 Summer Olympics